Inga pauciflora, the guabita de río, is a species of plant in the family Fabaceae. The specific epithet pauciflora is Latin for 'few-flowered'. It is found only in Panama. It is threatened by habitat loss.

References

pauciflora
Taxonomy articles created by Polbot